Hannonville-sous-les-Côtes is a commune in the Meuse department in Grand Est in north-eastern France.

See also
Communes of the Meuse department
Parc naturel régional de Lorraine

References

External links

 Official website

Hannonvillesouslescotes
Meuse communes articles needing translation from French Wikipedia